The Outline may refer to:
 The Outline (band), an American rock band
 The Outline (website), an online news magazine

See also
 Outline (disambiguation)